The men's singles tennis event at the 2017 Summer Universiade was held from August 21 to 29 at the Taipei Tennis Center in Taipei, Taiwan.

Jason Jung won the gold medal, defeating Hong Seong-chan in the final, 6–2, 6–4.

Nuno Borges  and Roman Safiullin won the bronze medals.

Seeds
All seeds receive a bye into the second round.

Main draw

Finals

Top half

Section 1

Section 2

Section 3

Section 4

Bottom half

Section 5

Section 6

Section 7

Section 8

References
Main Draw

Men's singles